Japanese football in 1975

Japan Soccer League

Division 1

Division 2

Japanese Regional Leagues

Emperor's Cup

National team

Results

Players statistics

External links

 
Seasons in Japanese football